Rahue River is a river of Chile located in Los Lagos Region. It rises at the western end of the Rupanco Lake. In its middle course, the river flows through the city of Osorno in a north-south direction. Rahue river empties into the Bueno River 40 km inland from the Pacific Ocean.

See also
List of rivers of Chile

References

Rivers of Los Lagos Region
Rivers of Chile